The Jochstock (2,564 m) is a summit of the Urner Alps, located near Engelberg in Central Switzerland. The summit is one of the two tripoints between the cantons of Berne, Nidwalden and Obwalden (the other being the Graustock).

A platter lift runs from the Joch Pass (2,207 m) to near the summit of the Jochstock.

References

External links
 Jochstock on Hikr

Mountains of the Alps
Mountains of Switzerland
Mountains of the canton of Bern
Mountains of Nidwalden
Mountains of Obwalden
Bern–Obwalden border
Nidwalden–Obwalden border
Bern–Nidwalden border
Two-thousanders of Switzerland